The 2009 Bosch Engineering 250 at VIR was the second round of the 2009 Rolex Sports Car Series season. It took place at Virginia International Raceway on April 25, 2009.

Race results
Class Winners in bold.

Bosch Engineering 250
VIR 240
Bosch Engineering 250